Macha Bolarum or Machabollarum or Macha Bollaram is a major locality in Alwal circle of Secunderabad zone of Hyderabad, India. It comes under Alwal Mandal of Medchal–Malkajgiri district. It is 5km far from kompally, 2km from Alwal, 10km from Secunderabad railway station, 11km from Begumpet airport and 42km from Rajiv Gandhi International Airport. It is administered as Ward No. 133 of Greater Hyderabad Municipal Corporation.

Transport 
Macha Bolaram is 9 km away from Secunderabad Railway station and 12 km away from Begumpet Airport and almost 43 km from Rajiv Gandhi International Airport.

Public transport include, city buses operated by TSRTC and MMTS rail services from Bolaram Bazar railway station.

References

 

Neighbourhoods in Hyderabad, India
Municipal wards of Hyderabad, India